This is a list of the National Register of Historic Places listings in Harford County, Maryland.

This is intended to be a complete list of the properties and districts on the National Register of Historic Places in Harford County, Maryland, United States.  Latitude and longitude coordinates are provided for many National Register properties and districts; these locations may be seen together in a map.

There are 80 properties and districts listed on the National Register in the county, including one National Historic Landmark called Sion Hill.

Current listings

|}

See also

 List of National Historic Landmarks in Maryland
 National Register of Historic Places listings in Maryland

References

Harford